The Fender '65 Twin Custom 15 is a guitar amplifier produced by Fender. It is a tube combo amp that pairs an 85-watt reissued Fender '65 Twin chassis with an enlarged cabinet and single 15 inch speaker.

Characteristics
Pre-amp tubes - 4 x 12AX7, 2 X 12AT7
Power tubes - 4 x 6L6
Wattage - 85 watts into 4 ohms
Speaker - 15" with ceramic magnet
Speaker jacks - Two 1/4 inch parallel (internal and external)
Channels - Two (normal and vibrato)
Normal channel
Two 1/4 inch inputs
Bright switch
Volume
Treble, middle and bass EQ
Vibrato channel
Two 1/4 inch inputs
Bright switch
Volume
Treble, middle and bass EQ
Reverb
 Vibrato - Speed and intensity

References

Instrument amplifiers
T